The Apostolic Vicariate of Tabuk is a Latin Church ecclesiastical missionary jurisdiction or apostolic vicariate of the Catholic Church in the Philippines covering the provinces of Kalinga and Apayao in northern Luzon.

It is exempt directly to Holy See and not part of any ecclesiastical province, yet for the purpose of apostolic cooperation usually grouped with the Archdiocese of Tuguegarao. It also has a working partnership with the Apostolic Vicariate of Bontoc-Lagawe and the Diocese of Baguio, both in the Cordilleras, to coordinate Catholic missions among the Igorot tribes. 

Its cathedral is the Saint William’s Cathedral, in Tabuk, Kalinga on the island of Luzon.

History 
Established on 6 July 1992 as Apostolic Vicariate of Tabuk by Pope John Paul II with the Apostolic Constitution, Philippinarum Insularum fideles, on territory split off from the then Apostolic Vicariate of Mountain Provinces (now diocese of Baguio).

Ordinaries

Apostolic Vicars of Tabuk

References

Sources and External links 
 Claretian Publications; Apostolic Vicariate of Tabuk
 GCatholic, with incumbent biography links

Apostolic vicariates
1992 establishments in the Philippines